The Times-News is an American, English language daily newspaper headquartered in Hendersonville, North Carolina. It has served Henderson, Transylvania and Polk counties in the Blue Ridge Mountains of Western North Carolina since 1881. The Hendersonville Times began in 1881 and the Hendersonville News in 1894.

History
The Times-News was founded in 1881.  The newspaper has been known as:
 The Times-News. (Hendersonville, N.C.) 1927-current
 Hendersonville Times. (Hendersonville, N.C.) 1924-1927
 The Hendersonville News. (Hendersonville, N.C.) 1919-1927
 The News of Henderson County. (Hendersonville, N.C.) 1918-1919
 Independent Herald. (Hendersonville, N.C.) 1881-18??

In December 1985, it became an A.M. paper and added a Sunday edition. With a daily circulation of approximately 15,000, the Times-News averages about 40,000 readers per day.

In May 2007, it relaunched its website (formerly known as HendersonvilleNews.com) as BlueRidgeNow.com.  The Times-News also has a Facebook page, the BlueRidgeNow (BRN).

The Times-News was owned by Halifax Media Group until 2015, when Halifax was acquired by New Media Investment Group.

Personnel
Kevin Drake - Publisher
Jennifer Heaslip - Managing Editor 
Reporters - Rebecca Walter, Derek Lacey, Andrew Mundhenk, Dean Hensley, Joey Millwood and photographer Patrick Sullivan

References

External links
 http://www.BlueRidgeNow.com

Times-News, The
Daily newspapers published in North Carolina
Publications established in 1881
1881 establishments in North Carolina
Gannett publications